Elías Fernández Albano (1845 - September 6, 1910) was a Chilean politician, who was acting president of Chile from August 16, 1910 until his death.

He was born in Santiago de Chile, the son of Juan de Dios Fernández Gana and María del Pilar Albano Vergara. He was great-grandson of Juan Albano Pereira Márquez.He studied at the Instituto Nacional and later graduated as a lawyer from the Universidad de Chile. He was accepted to the bar on May 18, 1869. On August 16, 1871, he married Mercedes Barañao Ochagavía.

He was elected Deputy for Lontué in 1885 and reelected in 1891. In 1894 he was elected for the Talca, Curepto and Lontué district. Fernández was twice Minister of Industry and Public Works under President Jorge Montt (1894-1896); Minister of War and Navy (1896–97), Finance (1897) and Interior (1899-1900) under Federico Errázuriz Echaurren, and again minister of Interior under Germán Riesco Errázuriz (1902-1903).

In 1910, President Pedro Montt Montt, seriously ill, took a leave of absence and moved to Germany for treatment, which proved unsuccessful, and Fernández, as Minister of the Interior, served during Montt's absence and became acting president upon Montt's death on August 16, 1910.  Fernández, however, caught a cold during Montt's funeral, which soon turned into pulmonary, causing him to die of heart failure in Santiago de Chile on September 6, 1910, after only three weeks in office.

References

External links

Genealogical chart

External links 

1845 births
1910 deaths
Cruz Family
People from Santiago
Chilean people of Spanish descent
National Party (Chile, 1857) politicians
Presidents of Chile
Heads of state of Chile
Chilean Ministers of the Interior
Chilean Ministers of Defense
Chilean Ministers of Public Works
Members of the Chamber of Deputies of Chile
Instituto Nacional General José Miguel Carrera alumni
University of Chile alumni